Baraeus itzingeri is a species of beetle in the family Cerambycidae. It was described by Stephan von Breuning in 1935. It is known from Tanzania and the Democratic Republic of the Congo.

References

Pteropliini
Beetles described in 1935